Augustine Creek is a  long tributary of Delaware Bay in New Castle County, Delaware.  Augustine Creek is tidal for most of its course.

See also
List of Delaware rivers

References

Rivers of Delaware
Rivers of New Castle County, Delaware
Tributaries of Delaware Bay